Yashpal Mohanty (6 November 1978 – 23 February 2017) was an Indian cricketer. He died after being in a coma for two years following a car accident. He played in seven first-class and seven List A matches for Odisha between 1997 and 2002. His family announced the foundation of BEN-E-VOLENT, in memory of Yasphal, an organization to give financial aid to patients of neurosurgery, cardiac, and paediatric care.

References

External links
 

1978 births
2017 deaths
Indian cricketers
Odisha cricketers
People from Cuttack
Cricketers from Odisha
Road incident deaths in India